"Waited Too Long"/"Play It Loud" is a single by British heavy metal band Diamond Head, released in 1981 via DHM Records. It was a double A-side with "Waited Too long" and "Play It Loud". Both tracks eventually ended up on the re-released version of Diamond Head's 1980 debut Lightning to the Nations in 2001 by Sanctuary Records.

Track listing
 "Waited Too Long"
 "Play It Loud"

Lineup
Brian Tatler
Sean Harris
Duncan Scott
Colin Kimberley

Charts

References 

1981 singles
Diamond Head (band) songs
1981 songs
Song articles with missing songwriters